The 2008 FIBA Diamond Ball was an official basketball tournament held in Nanjing, China, from July 29 until August 1, 2008. The FIBA Diamond Ball was an official international basketball tournament organised by FIBA, held every Olympic year prior to the Olympics. It was the 3rd edition of the FIBA Diamond Ball. The six participating teams were Angola, Argentina, Australia, host China, Iran and Serbia.

Participating teams

 – African champions
 – Olympic champions & Americas runners-up (USA were Americas champions)
 – Oceania champions
 – Olympics hosts
 – Asian champions
 – 2004 FIBA Diamond Ball winners (as Serbia and Montenegro; Spain were World champions; Russia was European champions)

Preliminary round

Group A
*All times are China Standard Time (UTC+8).

|}

Group B
*All times are China Standard Time (UTC+8).

|}

Final round
*All times are China Standard Time (UTC+8).

5th place

Third place

Final

Final standings
The final standings per FIBA official website:

See also 
 Acropolis Tournament
 Basketball at the Summer Olympics
 FIBA Basketball World Cup
 FIBA Asia Cup
 Adecco Cup
 Marchand Continental Championship Cup
 Belgrade Trophy
 Stanković Cup
 William Jones Cup

References

External links 
2008 FIBA Diamond Ball Archive

Diamond Ball
Recurring sporting events established in 2008